Božena Miklošovičová (born 27 February 1949) is a Slovak basketball player. She competed in the women's tournament at the 1976 Summer Olympics.

References

External links
 

1949 births
Living people
Slovak women's basketball players
Olympic basketball players of Czechoslovakia
Basketball players at the 1976 Summer Olympics
Sportspeople from Bratislava